The 2005 Styrian state election was held on 2 October 2005 to elect the members of the Landtag of Styria.

The result was a historic defeat for the Austrian People's Party (ÖVP), who had governed the state uninterrupted since 1945. The Social Democratic Party of Austria (SPÖ) became the largest party on a swing of over nine percentage points. The election was also significant in other ways: the Freedom Party of Austria (FPÖ) lost all its seats for the first time since entering the Landtag in 1949, and suffered its worst result since 1974 in terms of vote share. Conversely, the Communist Party of Austria (KPÖ) returned to the Landtag after a 35-year absence. It became the third largest party with four seats.

SPÖ leader Franz Voves became the new Governor of Styria. Outgoing Governor Waltraud Klasnic sought to remain regional ÖVP leader, but was forced to resign shortly after the election.

Background
Prior to amendments made in 2011, the Styrian constitution mandated that cabinet positions in the state government (state councillors) be allocated between parties proportionally in accordance with the share of votes won by each; this is known as Proporz. As such, the government was a perpetual coalition of all parties that qualified for at least one state councillor.

The 2000 election was a decisive victory for the ÖVP, which improved its vote share by eleven points to 47%, falling two seats short of an absolute majority. This was balanced by losses for the SPÖ, FPÖ, and Liberal Forum.

The KPÖ gained national attention after an unexpected record showing in the 2003 local elections in Graz, the capital of Styria, winning 21% and becoming the third largest party in the municipal council. This was attributed to an effective campaign and the popularity of leader Ernest Kaltenegger. The party gained popularity statewide in the aftermath, particularly after Kaltenegger was announced as lead candidate for the 2005 state election.

Electoral system
The 56 seats of the Landtag of Styria were elected via open list proportional representation in a two-step process. 48 of the seats were distributed between four multi-member constituencies. For parties to receive any representation in the Landtag, they must win at least one seat in a constituency directly. Seats were distributed in constituencies according to the Hare quota, with nine leveling seats allocated using the D'Hondt method at the state level, to ensure overall proportionality between a party's vote share and its share of seats.

Contesting parties

In addition to the parties already represented in the Landtag, four parties collected enough signatures to be placed on the ballot:

 Communist Party of Austria (KPÖ)
 Hirschmann List (LH)
 Alliance for the Future of Austria (BZÖ)
 Party-free List (Parteifrei)

Results

Results by constituency

References

2005 elections in Austria
State elections in Austria
October 2005 events in Europe